The Big 12 Conference Softball Player of the Year is a college softball award given to the Big 12 Conference's most outstanding player. The award was first given following the 1996 season, with both pitchers and position players eligible. After the 2002 season, the Big 12 Conference Softball Pitcher of the Year award was created to honor the most outstanding pitcher.

Key

Winners

Winners by school

References

Awards established in 1996
Player
NCAA Division I softball conference players of the year